2MASS J12195156+3128497 (abbreviated to 2MASS J1219+3128) is a rapidly-rotating brown dwarf of spectral class L8, located in the constellation Coma Berenices about 66 light-years from Earth. With a photometrically measured rotation period of 1.14 hours, it is one of the fastest-rotating known brown dwarfs announced by a team of astronomers led by Megan E. Tannock in March 2021. As a consequence of its rapid rotation, the brown dwarf is slightly flattened at its poles to a similar degree as Saturn, the most oblate planet in the Solar System. Its rapid rotation may enable strong auroral radio emissions via particle interactions in its magnetic field, as observed in other known rapidly-rotating brown dwarfs.

Discovery 
2MASS J1219+3128 was first catalogued as a point source in June 2003 by the Two Micron All-Sky Survey (2MASS) organized by the University of Massachusetts Amherst
and the Infrared Processing and Analysis Center under the California Institute of Technology. It was discovered to be a brown dwarf of the spectral class L8 by K. Chiu and collaborators, based on near-infrared observations obtained from the Sloan Digital Sky Survey (SDSS) at Apache Point Observatory in New Mexico, United States. Their discovery and classification of 71 L and T dwarfs including 2MASS J1219+3128 (designated alternatively as SDSS J121951.45+312849.4) was published in The Astronomical Journal in June 2006.

Distance 
The distance of 2MASS J1219+3128 from Earth has not yet been measured with trigonometric parallax, so instead it is calculated from the spectrophotometric relation of spectral type and near-infrared absolute magnitude. Schmidt et al.

Proper motion 
2MASS J1219+3128 has a net proper motion of 238.2 mas/yr with position angle 257.98 degrees, indicating motion in south-west direction on the sky.

See also 
The other two discoveries of rapidly-rotating brown dwarfs, presented in Tannock et al. (2021):
 2MASS J04070752+1546457 – L3.5 spectral class brown dwarf with a period of 
 2MASS J03480772−6022270 – T7 spectral class brown dwarf with a period of

Notes

References

External links 
 Trio of Fast-Spinning Brown Dwarfs May Reveal a Rotational Speed Limit, Calla Cofield, Jet Propulsion Laboratory, 7 April 2021
 Western space scientists identify fastest-spinning "failed stars" ever found, Jeff Renaud, University of Western Ontario, 7 April 2021
 Caught Speeding: Clocking the Fastest-Spinning Brown Dwarfs, NOIRLab, 7 April 2021

Coma Berenices
Brown dwarfs
L-type stars
J12195156+3128497
Astronomical objects discovered in 2006
TIC objects